Agathotoma quadriseriata is a species of sea snail, a marine gastropod mollusk in the family Mangeliidae.

Description
The height of the shell attains 5 mm, its diameter 2 mm.

(Original description) The small, stout shell is blunt. Its color is white, with a brown peripheral band and another one on the base. The protoconch is small, blunt, at first smooth and then spirally striated, in all about 2 whorls followed in the teleoconch  by five subsequent whorls. The axial sculpture consists of eight rounded ribs, partly continuous up the spire, undulating the suture and with subequal interspaces. Faint lines of growth cross the transverse sculpture. The spiral ornamentation of almost microscopically fine threads are spread uniform over the shell, with wider flat interspaces. The aperture is short and wide with no differentiated siphonal canal. The anal sulcus is conspicuous. The outer lip is thickened, smooth inside.

Distribution
This marine species occurs from the Gulf of California to Acapulco, Mexico

References

External links
  Bouchet P., Kantor Yu.I., Sysoev A. & Puillandre N. (2011) A new operational classification of the Conoidea. Journal of Molluscan Studies 77: 273-308. 
  Tucker, J.K. 2004 Catalog of recent and fossil turrids (Mollusca: Gastropoda). Zootaxa 682:1-1295.
 

quadriseriata
Gastropods described in 1919